Hachisuka is a family name of Japanese origin and may refer to:

People
 Hachisuka clan, extended Japanese family
 Hachisuka Iemasa (1558-1639), Japanese daimyō
 Hachisuka Haruaki (1758–1814), Japanese daimyō
 Hachisuka Masakatsu (also named Hachisuka Koroku, 1526–1586), Japanese daimyō 
 Masako Hachisuka (born 1941), Japanese linguist
 Masauji Hachisuka (1903–1953), Japanese ornithologist and aviculturist
 Hachisuka Mitsutaka (1630–1666), Japanese daimyō
 Hachisuka Mochiaki (1846–1918), Japanese daimyō and senior government official
 Hachisuka Munekazu (1709–1735), Japanese daimyō
 Hachisuka Muneshige (1721–1780), Japanese daimyō
 Hachisuka Muneteru (1684–1743), Japanese daimyō
 Hachisuka Narihiro (1821–1868), Japanese daimyō
 Hachisuka Narimasa (1795–1859), Japanese daimyō
 Hachisuka Shigeyoshi (1738–1801), Japanese daimyō
 Hachisuka Tadateru (1611–1652), Japanese daimyō
 Hachisuka Tsunamichi (1656–1678), Japanese daimyō
 Hachisuka Tsunanori (1661–1730), Japanese daimyō
 Hachisuka Yoshihiro (1737–1754), Japanese daimyō
 Hachisuka Yoshishige (1586–1620), Japanese daimyō
, Japanese biathlete
 Koji Hachisuka (born 1990), Japanese football player

Places
  Hachisuka, near Kiso river at the border of Owari and Mino Provinces
  Hachisuka castle

See also
 Hachisuka scroll

Japanese-language surnames